Gonçalo Carvalho (born 1 April 1982 in Lisbon, Portugal) is a Portuguese Olympic dressage rider. Representing Portugal, he competed at the 2012 Summer Olympics in London where he finished 16th in the individual competition.

He also competed at the 2010 World Equestrian Games and at three European Dressage Championships (in 2011, 2013 and 2015). His current best championship result 11th place in team dressage at the 2013 European Dressage Championship and at the 2010 World Equestrian Games.

References

Living people
1982 births
Sportspeople from Lisbon
Portuguese male equestrians
Portuguese dressage riders
Equestrians at the 2012 Summer Olympics
Olympic equestrians of Portugal